Francesca Rossi (born December 7, 1962) is an Italian computer scientist, currently working at the IBM T.J. Watson Research Lab (New York, USA) as an IBM Fellow and the IBM AI Ethics Global Leader.

Education and career
She received her bachelor and master degree in Computer Science from the University of Pisa in 1986, and a PhD in Computer Science from the same university in 1993.
After her graduation, she stayed at the University of Pisa as an assistant professor until 1998. 
She then moved to the University of Padova where she has been an associate professor until 2001, and a full professor until 2018.
In 2014-2015 she has been on sabbatical as a Fellow of Radcliffe Institute for Advanced Studies, Harvard University.
In 2015 she joined IBM Research, at the T.J. Watson IBM Research Lab (New York, USA), as a distinguished researcher.
In 2020 she become an executive and appointed as an IBM Fellow.

Research interests
Her research interests are in the area of Artificial Intelligence, with particular focus on constraint programming, combinatorial optimization, preference modeling, reasoning, and aggregation, knowledge representation, constrained reinforcement learning, ethically-aligned AI, neuro-symbolic AI, and cognitive AI architectures. In the past, she has also worked on language semantics, graph grammars, logic programming, and Petri nets. She is also interested in understanding how to embed ethical principles into decision making systems, to support either individuals or groups make more ethical decisions. Topics of special attention, in this regards, are detecting bias, defining distances between preference models, as well as embedding ethical behavioral constraints into reinforcement learning models. Most recently, her research interest is in leveraging cognitive theories of human reasoning and decision making, such as the thinking fast and slow theory of D. Kahneman, to advance AI’s capabilities.

On these topics, she has published over 230 articles in international journals and conferences. She has also edited over 20 volumes, including the Handbook of Constraint Programming. She co-authored the book "A Short Introduction to Preferences: Between Artificial Intelligence and Social Choice", published in the Synthesis Lectures on Artificial Intelligence and Machine Learning, Morgan & Claypool Publishers, July 2011, and she authored the book "Il confine del futuro -- Possiamo fidarci dell'Intelligenza Artificiale?", published by Feltrinelli for the Italian market.</ref>

Awards, honors, and appointments
Association for the Advancement of Artificial Intelligence (AAAI), president, 2022-2024
Women in Tech association, Tecnovisionarie award — Artificial Intelligence, AI ethics category, 2021
General chair, AAAI conference, 2020
Radcliffe Fellowship, 2014–2015
President, International Joint Conference on Artificial Intelligence (IJCAI), 2013 – 2015 
Fellow, Association for the Advancement of Artificial Intelligence (AAAI), 2012
Association for Constraint Programming, distinguished service award, 2010
Fellow, European Association for Artificial Intelligence (EurAI), 2008
President, Association for Constraint Programming, 2003–2007

AI Ethics roles
Francesca is a leader in the field of AI ethics, both with her AI research projects aimed at embedding human values in AI systems
and the many roles she has had, or currently has, in this area:
Board member, Partnership on AI, 2016-currently
Steering Committee member and expert, Global Partnership on AI, 2020-currently
Co-chair, World Economic Forum Global Future Council on AI for Humanity, 2020-2022
Member, European Commission High Level Expert Group on AI, 2018-2019
Member, scientific advisory board of the Future of Life Institute, 2015-currently
Co-chair, IBM AI ethics board, 2019-currently
Co-chair, IJCAI 2022 special track on AI for good, 2022
Program co-chair, 1st AAAI/ACM conference on AI Ethics and Society, 2018
Steering committee member, AAAI/ACM conference on AI Ethics and Society, 2018-currently
IBM AI Ethics Global Leader, 2017-currently

TEDx Talks
Francesca has delivered 4 TEDx talks, on topics related to AI:
“Sustainable AI”, TEDx Osnabruck University, 2015
“Ethical Artificial Intelligence”, TEDx Ghent, 2015
“Convivere con l’Intelligenza Artificiale”, TEDx Lake Como, 2015
"Macchine che aiutano a pensare", TEDx Reggio Emilia, 2022

Podcasts
She has delivered several online talks and podcast, including "Fast and Slow AI", Francesca Rossi and Daniel Kahneman, CERN SPARK, 2021

Media coverage
Francesca has been interviewed by several prominent media venues, including:
D di Repubblica (May 2021), The Nikkei (June 2021), Insider: Inside the Technology (September 2021), Fortune (December 2021), The Financial Times (Sept. 2018), The Nikkei (Jan. 2018), The Economist (June 2016), The Washington Post (May 2015), the Wall Street Journal (May 2015), Sydney Morning Herald (Feb. 2015), Euronews (Jan. 2015).

She has also written some pieces for the media, such as:
"How IBM is Working Towards a Fairer AI", Harvard Business Review, Nov. 2020

References

External links

1962 births
Living people
Radcliffe fellows
Artificial intelligence researchers
Italian computer scientists
Italian women computer scientists
University of Pisa alumni
Academic staff of the University of Padua
Fellows of the Association for the Advancement of Artificial Intelligence
IBM employees
IBM people
IBM Women
Academics